Elena Nikolova Yoncheva (born 27 May 1964) is a Bulgarian freelance journalist and politician who has been serving as a Member of the European Parliament since 2019. 

A former Bulgarian National Television correspondent, Yoncheva has reported from many conflict areas. She has authored more than 25 TV documentaries on these conflicts including Ukraine, after filming the war in Donbas she was informed that she was not allowed to enter the country anymore.  and while reporting from Iraq in 2003, she had a narrow escape from tragedy being rescued from armed civilians by an Iraqi official. In June 2013, she was injured by a tear-gas grenade while reporting from Istanbul, Turkey.

Early life
Yoncheva was born on 27 May 1964 in Sofia, to parents Nikola and Larisa. She datеd Sergey Stanishev, former Prime Minister of Bulgaria, between 1994 and 2009; they had known each other since their student years in Moscow, Russia.

Career in journalism
Yoncheva has reported from Kosovo, Algeria, Chechnya, Israel, Somalia, Afghanistan, Iraq, Venezuela, Colombia and other hot spots. Yoncheva has also authored a documentary on the Bulgarian Antarctic base, the Roma in Lom and on other topics. In 2008, she became a participant in bTV's television series Dancing Stars. Since October 2013, she is co-anchor of TV7's show "The Original", together with Ivan Garelov. Yoncheva filmed the documentary "The Border" which denounces the trafficking of migrants through Bulgaria, which is allegedly facilitated by Bulgarian authorities.

Member of the European Parliament, 2019–present
Yoncheva was elected to the European Parliament on the Bulgarian Socialist Party ticket, during the 2019 European Parliament election in Bulgaria. As part of her campaign for a Member of the European Parliament, she shared evidence allegedly proving corruption in the Bulgarian Ministry of Culture. 

In parliament, Yoncheva is a member of the Committee on Civil Liberties, Justice and Home Affairs and the Subcommittee on Security and Defence. She is also member of the Democracy, Rule of Law & Fundamental Rights Monitoring Group. 

In addition to her committee assignments, Yoncheva is part of the parliament's delegations for relations with Israel and to the Parliamentary Assembly of the Union for the Mediterranean.

References

External links 
 
 

Bulgarian journalists
Bulgarian women journalists
1964 births
People from Sofia
Living people
Women war correspondents
MEPs for Bulgaria 2019–2024
Bulgarian Socialist Party MEPs